The 2003 Richmondshire District Council election took place on 1 May 2003 to elect members of Richmondshire District Council in North Yorkshire, England. The whole council was up for election  with boundary changes since the last election in 1999. The council stayed under no overall control.

Background
Before the election the council was run by the independents with support from the Conservatives, while the Liberal Democrats formed the opposition. The independents were divided into two groups after the Richmondshire Independent Group split from the Richmondshire Association of Independent Councillors in 2001.

Almost a third of the councillors stood down at the 2003 election, including a former chairperson of the council, Jane Metcalfe, and the Liberal Democrat group leader, Richard Good. Other councillors who stood down included Alison Appleton, Colin Bailey, Grace Buckle, Sylvia Golding, Mike Graham, Terry Jones, Andrea Robson and Nigel Watson.

A total of 56 candidates stood in 2003, with several being elected without opposition, however there were no candidates from the Labour Party. The two groups of independents stood against each in several wards including Colburn, Hornby Castle and Melsonby. Meanwhile, the leader of the council, John Blackie, contested the election as a Conservative after having previously led the Richmondshire Association of Independent Councillors.

Election result
The Conservatives became the largest group on the council with 11 councillors, after gaining four seats, but without a majority. Nine independents were elected, a gain of four, while the Liberal Democrats dropped two to have eight councillors.

The council leader John Blackie held his seat in Hawes as a Conservative, while councillors who were defeated included Liberal Democrat Patrick Brennan in Catterick, Richmondshire Independent Helen Grant and Katherine Kerr in Richmond Central. Overall turnout at the election was 37.69%, down from 40.22% in 1999.

Following the election Yvonne Peacock became leader of the Conservative group, Richard Dunn leader of the Richmondshire Association of Independent Councillors, John Harris leader of the Liberal Democrat group and Paul Cullen leader of the Richmondshire Independent Group. Conservative John Blackie continued as leader of the council, defeating a challenge from the Liberal Democrat group leader John Harris.

Ward results

By-elections between 2003 and 2007
A by-election was held in Gilling West on 2 November 2006 after the resignation of independent councillor John Cronin. The seat was won by independent William Heslop with a majority of 116 votes over Conservative candidate Margaret Turnbull.

References

2003
2003 English local elections
2000s in North Yorkshire